An LS swap is a type of engine swap using any form factor of General Motors's LS V8 engine series. Motor Trend noted in 2020 that "the Chevy LS V-8 engine has become the de facto engine swap suggestion for anyone seeking to add power to their existing platform" due to the engine's relatively compact size and light weight. LS swaps have been performed since the introduction of GM's LS1 engine in 1997. Widespread aftermarket support for LS swaps has developed in subsequent years.

See also
 List of GM engines

References

Vehicle modifications